Adams Radio Group is a radio broadcasting company focused on medium to small markets in the United States. Adams began in the early 1980s with radio stations in several markets across the country. The original market stations were all sold by 1996.

The radio station groups in this article were formed in 1996.

Markets and radio stations

Fort Wayne
WBTU in Kendallville, Indiana
WJFX in New Haven, Indiana
WWFW in Fort Wayne, Indiana
WXKE in Churubusco, Indiana
W245CA in Fort Wayne, Indiana
W277AK in Fort Wayne, Indiana

Northwest Indiana
WLJE in Valparaiso, Indiana
WXRD in Crown Point, Indiana
WZVN in Lowell, Indiana

Las Cruces
KGRT in Las Cruces, New Mexico
KHQT in Las Cruces, New Mexico
KSNM in Truth or Consequences, New Mexico
KWML in Las Cruces, New Mexico

Tallahassee
WHTF in Havana, Florida
WQTL in Tallahassee, Florida
WWOF in Tallahassee, Florida
WXTY in Lafayette, Florida

References

External links 
Adams Radio Group Corporate Website

Radio broadcasting companies of the United States